Dipendra Shrestha is a Nepalese politician belonging to Nepali Congress. He is a member of Provincial Assembly of Bagmati Province.

Shrestha is  currently serving as Minister for Culture and Tourism of Bagmati Province.

Electoral history

2017 Nepalese provincial elections

See also
 Prakash Man Singh
 Nepali Congress

References 

People from Kathmandu District
Nepali Congress politicians from Bagmati Province
Year of birth missing (living people)
Living people

Provincial cabinet ministers of Nepal
Members of the Provincial Assembly of Bagmati Province